The Canton of Châtelus-Malvaleix is a former canton situated in the Creuse département and in the Limousin region of central France. It was disbanded following the French canton reorganisation which came into effect in March 2015. It had 3,708 inhabitants (2012).

Geography 
An area of farming and forestry in the arrondissement of Guéret, centred on the town of Châtelus-Malvaleix. The altitude varies from 266m (Genouillac) to 566m (Roches) with an average altitude of 373m.

The canton comprised 10 communes:

Bétête
La Cellette
Châtelus-Malvaleix
Clugnat
Genouillac
Jalesches
Nouziers
Roches
Saint-Dizier-les-Domaines
Tercillat

Population

See also 
 Arrondissements of the Creuse department
 Cantons of the Creuse department
 Communes of the Creuse department

References

Chatelus-Malvaleix
2015 disestablishments in France
States and territories disestablished in 2015